Anders Rasmusson Vassbotn (16 May 1868 – 30 August 1944) was a Norwegian farmer, writer and politician for the Liberal Party. He was the mayor of Volda from 1911 to 1913. He sat in the Parliament of Norway from 1913 to 1930, and was a member of the Norwegian Nobel Committee from 1938 to 1939.

Liberal Party (Norway) politicians
Mayors of places in Møre og Romsdal
Members of the Storting
People from Volda
1868 births
1944 deaths